Valentin Mohr (born 1560 in Aschaffenburg) was a German clergyman and bishop for the Roman Catholic Diocese of Speyer. He was ordained in 1587. He was appointed bishop in 1606. He died in 1608.

References 

1608 deaths
German Roman Catholic bishops
1560 births